Level repulsion is the quantum mechanical equivalent to a repulsion effect in oscillators. A system of two coupled oscillators has two natural frequencies. As the coupling strength between the oscillators increases, the lower frequency decreases and the higher increases.

See also
 Avoided crossing
 Intersubband polariton
 Wigner–Ville distribution

References

Quantum mechanics